was a king of the Ryukyu Kingdom, the second ruler of the second Shō dynasty. He ruled for only six months after his elder brother Shō En died, and was forced to abdicate to his nephew, Shō Shin.

Shō Sen'i was named Prince of Goeku (越来王子) after his abdication, and given Goeku magiri (today part of Okinawa City) as his domain, but died in the same year. It has been suggested that he was murdered by the empress dowager Ukiyaka.

References

Chūzan Seifu(中山世譜)

Second Shō dynasty
Kings of Ryūkyū
Monarchs who abdicated
1430 births
1477 deaths